Frontier Justice is a 1935 black-and-white Western film directed by Robert F. McGowan starring Hoot Gibson based on the novel by Colonel George Brydges Rodney. Produced for Walter Futter's Diversion Pictures, it was rereleased by Grand National Pictures in 1937 and later reissued by Astor Pictures in the 1940s.

Plot
In order to seize his cattle ranch to turn it into a sheep pasture, a wealthy sheepman and a crooked doctor have the ranch owner Sam Holster certified insane and placed in an insane asylum. His son returns from five years in Baja California to stop the range war and set things straight using his six gun and a variety of mail order practical joke devices.

Cast
Hoot Gibson ... Brent Halston
 Jane Barnes ... Ethel Gordon
Richard Cramer ... Gilbert Ware
Roger Williams... James Wilton
John Elliott 	... Ben Livesay
Franklyn Farnum ... Lawyer George Lessin
Lloyd Ingraham ... Dr. Close
Joseph W. Girard 	... Samuel Halston 
Fred 'Snowflake' Toones ... Snowflake (as Snowflake)
 George Yeoman ... Sheriff Sam Simon

See also
 Hoot Gibson filmography

References

External links
 

1935 films
1935 Western (genre) films
American Western (genre) films
American black-and-white films
Grand National Films films
Films based on American novels
Films based on Western (genre) novels
Films directed by Robert F. McGowan
1930s American films